Chlorotachina is a genus of bristle flies in the family Tachinidae. There are at least three described species in Chlorotachina.

Species
These three species belong to the genus Chlorotachina:
 Chlorotachina flaviceps (Macquart, 1851) c
 Chlorotachina froggattii (Townsend, 1916) c
 Chlorotachina nigrocaerulea Malloch, 1929 c g
Data sources: i = ITIS, c = Catalogue of Life, g = GBIF, b = Bugguide.net

References

Further reading

External links

 
 

Tachinidae